The Antarctic silverfish (Pleuragramma antarctica), or Antarctic herring, is a species of marine ray-finned fish belonging to the family Nototheniidae, the notothens or cod icefishes. It is native to the Southern Ocean and the only truly pelagic fish in the waters near Antarctica. It is a keystone species in the ecosystem of the Southern Ocean.

While widely distributed around the Antarctic, the species appears to have largely disappeared from the western side of the northern Antarctic Peninsula, based on a 2010 research cruise funded by the National Science Foundation under the US Antarctic Program.

Taxonomy
The Antarctic silverfish was first formally described in 1902 by the Belgian-born British zoologist George Albert Boulenger with the type locality given as Victoria Land in Antarctica. It is the only species in the monotypic genus Pleuagramma which was also described by Boulenger. Some authorities place this taxon in the subfamily Pleuragrammatinae, but the 5th edition of Fishes of the World does not include subfamilies in the Nototheniidae. The genus name is a compound of pleuro meaning "side" with a which means "without" and gramma meaning "line", an allusion to the absence of a lateral line.

Description 
The maximum reported weight of this species is 200 g. Antarctic silverfish have a maximum reported age of 20 years. When alive, they are pink with a silver tint, but turn silver only after death. All the fins are pale. The dorsal side is slightly darker. This Antarctic marine fish is one of several in the region that produce antifreeze glycopeptides as an adaptation against the extreme cold of Antarctic waters.

Ecology 
The postlarvae,  in size, feed on eggs of calanoids (Calanoida), sea snails Limacina and tintinnids (Tintinnida). As their size increases, so does the size of their prey items. Mature females may spawn for the first time at 7–9 years of age.

Antarctic silverfish are the most abundant pelagic fish species in the High Antarctic shelf waters of the Southern Ocean and are important high-caloric prey species for high-trophic animals such as Adelie penguins, marine flying birds and Weddell seals.

References

Nototheniidae
Fish of Antarctica
Fish described in 1902